Len Ircandia (born July 28, 1954) is a former professional ice hockey defenceman.

Ircandia played five seasons of professional hockey (1974–79), appearing in 282 games in the International Hockey League with the Des Moines Capitols and the  Kalamazoo Wings. He also played 34 games in the Central Hockey League with the Seattle Totems, Tulsa Oilers, and Kansas City Red Wings.<ref></ref.</ref>

References

1954 births
Canadian ice hockey defencemen
Des Moines Capitols players
Ice hockey people from British Columbia
Kalamazoo Wings (1974–2000) players
Kansas City Red Wings players
Living people
Sportspeople from Trail, British Columbia
Seattle Totems (CHL) players
Tulsa Oilers (1964–1984) players
Canadian expatriate ice hockey players in the United States